The 2014–15 season is PAS Hamedan's 4th season in the Azadegan League.

Competitions

Results summary

Results by round

Matches

Hazfi Cup

See also
 2013–14 Azadegan League
 2013–14 Hazfi Cup

References

PAS Hamedan F.C. seasons
Pas Hamedan